Hello I Must Be Going is a 2012 American comedy-drama film written by Sarah Koskoff and directed by Todd Louiso. It stars Melanie Lynskey, Christopher Abbott and Blythe Danner. The film had its world premiere at the 2012 Sundance Film Festival, and was released theatrically in the United States on September 7, 2012. The title is a reference to a song from the Marx Brothers' film Animal Crackers.

Speaking of the casting decision of Lynskey in the lead, director Todd Louiso said, "I knew if I cast her, the film had the potential to resonate on a thousand different levels." After Lynskey's audition, "there was no one else."  The role represented a career breakthrough for Lynskey, who had previously played in numerous supporting roles.  In Hello I Must Be Going, she appears in every scene.

Synopsis
In the midst of a divorce and condemned to move back in with her parents at the age of 35, Amy Minsky's prospects are looking bleak. She's depressed, out of work, and fed up with everybody's so-called "advice", but a secret love affair with a handsome 19-year-old gradually reinstates her self-esteem.

Cast

 Melanie Lynskey as Amy Minsky, an unemployed divorcee who moves back in with her parents
 Blythe Danner as Ruth Minsky, Amy's mother
 Christopher Abbott as Jeremy Hammer, a 19-year-old actor and Gwen's son
 John Rubinstein as Stan Minsky, a lawyer and Amy's father
 Dan Futterman as David, an entertainment lawyer and Amy's ex-husband
 Julie White as Gwen Hammer, Jeremy's mother and Larry's wife
 Sara Chase as Missy Minsky, Amy's sister-in-law and Noah's wife
 Daniel Eric Gold as Noah Minsky, Amy's brother and Missy's husband who works as a lawyer with Stan
 Meera Simhan as Karen, a high school acquaintance of Amy's whom she reconnects with
 Damian Young as Larry, Jeremy's stepfather and Gwen's husband

 Tori Feinstein as Caley Minsky, Missy and Noah's daughter and Amy's niece
 Jimmi Simpson as Phil Bauer, another recent divorcee and friend of Missy and Noah whom Amy goes on a date with
 Greta Lee as a Gap employee
 Andrea Bordeaux as a hostess

Production
Filming took place primarily in Westport, Connecticut in August 2011. The shoot lasted 20 days.

Reception
The film received positive reviews from critics; it currently holds a 75% "fresh" rating on Rotten Tomatoes, based on 51 reviews, with the site's consensus stating: "Hello I Must Be Going offers an offbeat twist to the romance genre, a solid character study for fans of grown-up drama, and a career-making breakout vehicle for Melanie Lynskey." USA Today called it "a funny, well-written, involving and emotionally honest tale." Particular praise was given to Lynskey, with The Seattle Times calling her performance "a master class in acting." The Washington Post commented that "[the film] succeeds almost entirely on the strength of Lynskey's heartfelt and humorous performance,"  while Kenneth Turan of the Los Angeles Times wrote, "Lynskey inhabits the role so completely, brings such exquisite naturalness to her performance, that she becomes someone we root for unreservedly."

Awards
The film was nominated for the Grand Jury Prize in the U.S. Dramatic Competition at the 2012 Sundance Film Festival, and was named one of the Top Ten Independent Films of 2012 by the National Board of Review. Lynskey's performance earned a nomination for Breakthrough Actor at the 2012 Gotham Awards.

Soundtrack
The film's soundtrack was released on September 11, 2012. It features instrumental and vocal material by American singer/songwriter Laura Veirs.

 "I Can See Your Tracks"– 3:06
 "The Fox"– 2:14
 "Where Are You Driving" – 2:53
 "Little Lap Dog Lullaby" – 2:05
 "July Flame" – 4:18
 "Make Something Good" – 4:14
 "Tumblebee" – 2:36
 "Drink Deep" – 4:36
 "Prairie Dream" – 1:21
 "Carol Kaye" – 2:48
 "Song My Friends Taught Me" – 4:32
 "Little Deschutes" – 4:07
 "Silo Song" – 2:38
 "Spring Song" – 3:41

References

External links
 
 
 
 

2012 films
2012 romantic comedy-drama films
American romantic comedy-drama films
Films set in Connecticut
Films shot in Connecticut
American independent films
2012 independent films
2010s English-language films
Films directed by Todd Louiso
2010s American films